The Men's lightweight is a competition featured at the 2013 World Taekwondo Championships, and was held at the Exhibition Center of Puebla in Puebla, Mexico on July 16. Lightweights were limited to a maximum of 74 kilograms in body mass.

Medalists

Results
Legend
 DQ — Won by disqualification
 K — Won by knockout
 P — Won by punitive declaration
 W — Won by withdrawal

Finals

Top half

Section 1

Section 2

Section 3

Section 4

Bottom half

Section 5

Section 6

Section 7

Section 8

References
 Entry List
 Results
 Results Book Pages 380–442

Men's 74